Levoča
is a town in the Prešov Region of eastern Slovakia with a population of 14,700. The town has a historic center with a well preserved town wall, a Gothic church with the highest wooden altar in the world, carved by Master Pavol of Levoča, and many other Renaissance buildings.

On 28 June 2009, Levoča was added by UNESCO to its World Heritage List.

Etymology
The name is of Slovak origin and belongs to the oldest recorded Slovak settlement names in Spiš. It was originally the name of the stream Lěvoča, a tributary of river Hornád (present-day Levočský potok). The name probably derived from the adjective lěva (left, a left tributary); the linguist Rudolf Krajčovič has also suggested as an origin the word lěvoča meaning "regularly flooded area".

History
Levoča is located in the historical region of Spiš, which was inhabited as early as the Stone Age. In the 11th century, this region was conquered and, subsequently, became part of the Kingdom of Hungary and remained such until 1918. After the Mongol invasions of 1241/1242, the area was also settled by Germans. The town became the capital of the Association of Spiš Germans, with a form of self-rule within the Kingdom of Hungary. The oldest written reference to the city of Levoča dates back to 1249. In 1317, Levoča (at that time generally known by the German name of Leutschau - see Chronology below for lists of changing names) received the status of a royal town. In 1321 a wide storing right was granted enticing  merchants, craftsmen and mine owners to settle in this town.

In the 15th century the town, located on an intersection of trade routes between Poland and Hungary, became a rich center of commerce. It exported iron, copper, furs, leather, corn, and wine. At the same time the town became an important cultural centre. The English humanist Leonard Cox taught around 1520 in a school in Levoča. The bookseller Brewer from Wittenberg transformed his bookstore in a prolific printing plant, that lasted for 150 years. Finally, one of the best-known medieval woodcarvers Master Pavol of Levoča settled here.

The town kept this cultural and economic status until the end of 16th century, in spite of two damaging fires : the first in 1550 destroyed nearly all of the Gothic architecture and another in 1599. In this period of prosperity several churches were built and the town had a school, library, pharmacy, and physicians. There was a printing press as early as 1624. Levoča was a center of the Protestant Reformation. The town started to decline during the anti-Habsburg uprisings in the 17th century.

In a lurid sequence of events in 1700, the mayor of the town was accidentally wounded by a local nobleman during a hunt, generating a series of revenge attacks, finally resulting in the murder of the mayor, Karol Kramler, a Saxon magistrate. The mayor's arm was then cut off, embalmed, and preserved in the town hall as a call to further revenge. This became the subject of a Hungarian novel about the town, The Black City, by the writer Kálmán Mikszáth.

At the southern end of the main square, the Evangelical Church, Levoča was constructed from 1823 onwards, and consecrated in 1832. It replaced an earlier articular church outside the walls of the city.

The economic importance of the town was further diminished in 1871 when the important new Košice–Bohumín Railway was built just  to the south, bypassing Levoča and going through the nearby town of Spišská Nová Ves. Later, in 1892, only a spur line was built from Spišská Nová Ves railway station to Levoča.  Erwin Raisz, famed cartographer who emigrated to the United States after earning a degree in engineering and architecture from the University of Hungary and after serving in WWI, was born in Levoča in 1893. Raisz learned about map making from his father, also a civil engineer, and was no doubt inspired by the topography of his homeland to create a unique hand-drawn method of portraying physiographic features. He taught at Harvard University and wrote the first cartography textbook in English. 

After the Treaty of Trianon and the dismantling of the Kingdom of Hungary, the city became part of the newly formed Czechoslovakia and its Slovak name Levoča was formally adopted. Later, during World War II, under the auspices of the First Slovak Republic, 981 local Jews were deported from the town to concentration camps. On 27 January 1945 Levoča was taken by Soviet troops of the 18th Army.

On July 3, 1995 Levoča was visited by Pope John Paul II.

Geography
It is located in the northern part of the Hornád Basin at the foothills of the Levoča Hills, at the stream Levočský potok, a tributary of Hornád.

Historical Features
The old town is picturesquely sited and still surrounded by most of its ancient walls. In associating the town with Spiš Castle and Žehra in June 2009 as the renamed World Heritage Site of "Levoča, Spišský Hrad, and the Associated Cultural Monuments", UNESCO cites the town's historic center, its fortifications, and the works of Master Paul of Levoča preserved in the town.

The main entrance to the old town is via the monumental Košice Gate (15th century) behind which is located the ornate baroque Church of the Holy Spirit and the New Minorite Monastery (c. 1750).

The town square (Námestie Majstra Pavla - Master Paul’s Square) boasts three major monuments; the quaint Old Town Hall (15th-17th century) which now contains  a museum, the domed Evangelical Lutheran Church (1837) and the 14th century of Basilica of St. James (in Slovak: Bazilika svätého Jakuba, often mistakenly referred to in English as St. Jacob's). It houses a magnificently carved and painted wooden Gothic altar, the largest in Europe, ( in height), created by Master Paul around 1520. The square is very well preserved (despite one or two modern incursions) and contains a number of striking buildings which were the townhouses of the local nobility in the late Middle Ages. Also notable in the square is the wrought iron "Cage of Shame", dating back to the 17th century, used for public punishment of miscreants. A plaque on one of the houses records the printing and publication in the town of the most famous work of Comenius, the Orbis Pictus. Other buildings on the square house a historical museum and a museum dedicated to the work of Master Paul.

Behind the square on Kláštorská Street are the 14th-century church and remains of the old monastery of the Minorites, now incorporated into a Church grammar school. Nearby is the town's Polish Gate, a Gothic construction of the 15th century.

From the 16th century to the end of 1922, Levoča was the administrative center of the province of Szepes (Spiš). Between 1806 - 1826, the Hungarian architect from Eger Antal Povolny built a grandiose administration building, the Large Provincial House, as the seat of the town's administration. He adjusted its Classicist style to Levoča's Renaissance character by emphasizing the building's horizontal lines. The House is considered amongst most beautiful Provincial Houses in the former Kingdom of Hungary. Today, it is reconstructed and it is a seat of the administration.

The State Regional Archives (Štátny oblastný archív) are in a tan stone building on the north side of the square at nám. Majstra Pavla 60.

Demographics
Levoča has a population of 14,677 (as of December 31, 2005). According to the 2001 census, out of 14,366 inhabitants 87.07% were Slovaks 11.20% Romani, 0.33% Czechs and 0.31% Rusyns. The religious make-up was 79.54% Roman Catholics, 9.01% people with no religious affiliation, 3.87% Greek Catholics and 1.61% Lutherans.

Town and nearby settlements
Levoča (main town)
Levočská Dolina (=English: Levoča Valley). About  out of town, on the way to Závada.
Levočské Lúky (=English: Levoča Fields). Settlement on the road to Spišska Nová Ves.
Závada. Village in the hills above Levočská Dolina.

Listing of town names
Below is a listing of names by which the town of Levoča has been known or recorded. The names were not necessarily at any time mutually exclusive and often reflect minor linguistic differences.:
1249: Leucha
1268: Lyucha
1271: Lewcha
1277: Lyucha
1284: Leuche, Lyuche, Leiuche
1408: Lewscen
1479: Lewcsouia
1497: Leutschaw
1773: Lewucža
1786: Lewoče, Lőcse (Hungarian), Leutschau (German), Leuchovia (Latin), Leutschovia, Leutsaria
1808: Leutsovia, Lőcse, Leutschau, Lewoča
1863 - 1913: official name: Lőcse
since 1918: official name: Levoča

Twin towns — Sister cities

Levoča is twinned with:

 Stary Sącz, Poland
 Łańcut, Poland
 Kalwaria Zebrzydowska, Poland
 Keszthely, Hungary
 Litomyšl, Czech Republic

Gallery

See also
 Szepes county
 Spiš

References

Notes

External links

 Official website of Levoča
 Basilica of St. James
 Official website of Tourist Information Centre in Levoča
 Article about Levoča at Spectacular Slovakia
 Levoča International Music Festival ('Indian Summer in Levoča')
 The Large Provincial House (student work)

Cities and towns in Slovakia
Catholic pilgrimage sites
Fortified settlements
World Heritage Sites in Slovakia
Levoča